Floyd H. Millen (17 May 1919 – 18 May 1998) was an American politician.

Millen was born on 17 May 1919 in Watertown, South Dakota. He raised three sons with his wife Betty Coffin, whom he married in 1942. They lived in Farmington, Iowa, and from 1970, in West Des Moines. Millen's political experience before election as a state representative included thirteen years with the Farmington Independent School District as president and director. He was elected to the Iowa House of Representatives nine times consecutively, serving as a member for District 2 from 1963 to 1971, a single two-year term for District 99, followed by a four-term tenure as the representative of District 87. At the start of his third term, Millen, a Republican, was elected majority leader. He subsequently served as speaker pro tempore during his fourth and fifth terms, followed by two terms as minority leader and his final term in office as speaker. Millen died on 18 May 1998 at Iowa Methodist Medical Center in Des Moines, where he was seeking treatment for cancer.

References

Businesspeople from Iowa
20th-century American businesspeople
20th-century American politicians
Speakers of the Iowa House of Representatives
1919 births
1998 deaths
People from Watertown, South Dakota
People from West Des Moines, Iowa
School board members in Iowa
Republican Party members of the Iowa House of Representatives
People from Van Buren County, Iowa
Deaths from cancer in Iowa